Simretu Alemayehu (born September 17, 1970) is a retired male long-distance runner from Ethiopia, who competed for his native country at the 2000 Summer Olympics. He set his personal best (2:07:45) in the marathon on April 1, 2001 in Turin, Italy. As a steeplechaser he won the bronze medal in the men's 3.000 metres steeplechase at the 1993 African Championships in Durban, South Africa.

Achievements

External links

sports-reference

1970 births
Living people
Ethiopian male long-distance runners
Ethiopian male steeplechase runners
Olympic athletes of Ethiopia
Athletes (track and field) at the 2000 Summer Olympics
Ethiopian male marathon runners